Terror in the Crypt is a 1964 Italian-Spanish horror film directed by Camillo Mastrocinque. The film is based on the 1872 novel Carmilla by Joseph Sheridan Le Fanu.

Production
Terror in the Crypt is based on Sheridan Le Fanu's novel Carmilla. It is the third adaptation of the novel, following Carl Theodor Dreyer's Vampyr and Roger Vadim's Blood and Roses.

According to Tonino Valerii, the script was written in three days, while Ernesto Gastaldi stated that it was written in 24 hours. Gastaldi has also claimed that he lied to a producer that they had a script ready, and then returned home to pen the script to return to the producer with the following day. The original title of the script was entitled La maledizione dei Karnstein (lit.: "The Curse of the Karnsteins").

The film was originally going to be directed by Antonio Margheriti. Due to other commitments, the film was given to Camillo Mastrocinque to direct. Mastrocinque was more prominently known for his comedy films, and was suggested by agent Liliana Biancini in order to help find the director new work. Tonino Valerii was also the assistant director on set, and later claimed that he personally shot several scenes of the film.

Release
Terror in the Crypt was released in Italy on 27 May 1964 where it was distributed by MEC. It grossed a total of 69.541 million Italian lire. Terror in the Crypt was released straight to television in the United States by AIP-TV as Crypt of the Vampire. It was released theatrically in the United Kingdom as Crypt of Horror.

The film was released on DVD in 2012 by Retromedia/Image in the United States where it retains the title Crypt of the Vampire, while the credits in the film call it Terror in the Crypt.

Reception
In a contemporary review, an anonymous reviewer in the Monthly Film Bulletin described the film as "occasionally quite atmospheric" and having an "effective climax". The review concluded that the rest of the film was "slow and static, indifferently acted and directed, and poorly dubbed."

See also
Christopher Lee filmography
List of horror films of 1964
List of Italian films of 1964
List of Spanish films of 1964

Notes

References

External links
 

1964 horror films
1964 films
Italian horror films
Spanish horror films
Films directed by Camillo Mastrocinque
Films based on works by Sheridan Le Fanu
Gothic horror films
Films set in Austria
Films set in the 19th century
Films shot in Abruzzo
Films with screenplays by Ernesto Gastaldi
Films scored by Carlo Savina
Films based on Irish novels
Films based on horror novels
1960s Italian films
1960s Spanish films